Bradford C. Jacobsen (born January 18, 1957) is a Republican politician from Michigan who served in the Michigan House of Representatives.

Prior to his election to the House, Jacobsen served as an Oakland County Commissioner, township trustee, and chaired the Lake Orion Downtown Development Authority. He is also the vice president of Jacobsen's Flowers.

References

1957 births
Living people
Republican Party members of the Michigan House of Representatives
County commissioners in Michigan
Politicians from Pontiac, Michigan
Michigan State University alumni
21st-century American politicians
People from Oxford, Michigan